CFGO is a commercial AM radio station in Ottawa, Ontario, broadcasting on 1200 kHz. It is owned by Bell Media and broadcasts a sports radio format, using the brand name TSN 1200 Ottawa. The radio studios and offices are in the Bell Media Building on George Street in Downtown Ottawa's ByWard Market. CFGO features local Ottawa sports shows most of the day, with programming from TSN Radio, ESPN Radio and Fox Sports Radio nights and weekends. CFGO is the flagship station for the Ottawa Senators NHL team.

CFGO is powered at 50,000 watts, the maximum for Canadian AM stations. Because 1200 AM is a clear channel frequency reserved for Class A WOAI San Antonio, CFGO must use a directional antenna to protect WOAI from interference. CFGO has a six-tower array on Moodie Drive at Barnsdale Road in Barrhaven, Ontario. CFGO audio streaming is also available through iHeartRadio.

History

Music format
In 1964, Confederation Broadcasting signed on CKPM at 1440 AM. CKPM aired a Middle of the Road (MOR) format with popular adult music and a heavy local news commitment.

In 1970, the Canadian Radio-television and Telecommunications Commission revoked Confederation's licence, alleging that the company had failed to live up to its financial and management obligations. Confederation appealed to the Supreme Court of Canada, who ruled in April 1971 that Confederation had not had a fair hearing before the CRTC.

In 1972, majority interest in the station was sold to Baton Broadcasting. The station also adopted its current CFGO call sign that year and moved to a Top 40 music format to compete with top-rated CFRA.

Frequency and format changes
On November 15, 1984, CFGO Radio Ltd. received approval from the CRTC to change CFGO's frequency to 1200 kHz with power remaining at 50,000 watts day and night. The station moved to its AM 1200 on January 5, 1986, improving its signal.  It was sold to Rawlco Communications the following year.

Playing Starship's "We Built This City" as the inaugural song on the new 1200 AM frequency, Rawlco transitioned the station from Top 40 to Adult contemporary as "Adult Rock, Go 1200" at the same time as the frequency switch, with local actress Abby Hagyard (of You Can't Do That on Television fame) serving as morning co-host.  However, following CFRA's move from contemporary hits to an AC/oldies mix in August 1986, CFGO switched back to its previous all-hit presentation within a month. On March 8, 1988, Rawlco relaunched the CHR format, with the station downplaying its call letters in favour of the name Energy 1200. The station changed its call sign to CJBZ and its brand name to The Buzz in late 1997, with a focus on more alternative and modern rock.

All-sports format

On September 9, 1998, at 7:30 a.m., the station switched to its current all-sports format, using the brand name OSR1200 - Ottawa Sports Radio. It was acquired the following year by CHUM Limited, reverting to its CFGO call sign. In 1999, the station adopted the Team 1200 brand name.

On May 7, 2001, the station formed the basis for CHUM's short-lived national sports radio network The Team, which adopted the Ottawa station's brand identity. The station retained its format and brand when CHUM subsequently folded the network.

On June 22, 2007, CFGO along with the other CHUM stations were sold to CTVglobemedia (now known as Bell Media). On September 30, 2013, CFGO re-branded as TSN Radio 1200.

Programming
TSN 1200 broadcasts a wide variety of sports programming, as well as news and weather, and the station streams Fox Sports Radio and ESPN Radio at night. As the official radio station of the Ottawa Senators, it broadcasts every Ottawa Senators game live. The station also broadcasts Ottawa 67's games, Ottawa Redblacks games, Atlético Ottawa games, Ottawa Blackjacks games, Ottawa Titans and formerly broadcast Ottawa Lynx games.

Notable programs include TSN Mornings, In the Box, The Drive, Offside With Eric Macramalla, Sens Pre/Post-game Shows, RedBlacks Radio Show, Junior Hockey Magazine, among several others.

Live sports
TSN Radio 1200 is the flagship station for the following teams' radio broadcasts:

 Ottawa Senators (NHL hockey)
 Ottawa 67's (OHL hockey)
 Ottawa Redblacks (CFL football)
 Atlético Ottawa (CPL soccer)
 Ottawa Blackjacks (CEBL basketball)

TSN Radio 1200 also features live coverage of the following:

 NFL Football (select games)
 Belleville Senators (select games)
 World Juniors
 NBA Basketball (select games)

Podcasts
TSN Mornings 
In the Box
The Drive
Sens Pre-Game Show
Sens Post-Game Show
Offside With Eric Macramalla
TSN Weekend
RedBlacks Radio Show
CFL Weekly
The TSN MMA Show
She’s Got Game
Tee It Up
Corner Kicks Soccer Show
This is Wrestling
3 in the Key

References

External links

 

FGO
FGO
FGO
Sport in Ottawa
1964 establishments in Ontario
Radio stations established in 1964
ESPN Radio stations
Fox Sports Radio stations